Eupithecia stigmatophora is a moth in the family Geometridae. It is found in Colombia.

References

Moths described in 1914
stigmatophora
Moths of South America